Mordew is a 2020 fantasy novel by British author Alex Pheby. It is the first novel in the City of the Weft trilogy.

Premise
Nathan Treeves, a resident of the city of Mordew, finds he has special powers which rival those of the master of the city.

Publication and composition
Mordew is the first novel of a planned trilogy. The second instalment, Malarkoi, was published in September of 2022, and was positively received. The planned third instalment is named Waterblack. Galley Beggar Press will publish the remainder of the trilogy.

Reception
The novel has received mostly positive reviews from critics. In a review for The Guardian, Adam Roberts referred to it as "[...] a darkly brilliant novel, extraordinary, absorbing and dream-haunting."

The novel's style and content have garnered comparisons to the works of Charles Dickens, as well as the Gormenghast series by Mervyn Peake. Reviewers have likened its the works of Ursula K. Le Guin, Terry Pratchett, and China Miéville.

Writing for the Los Angeles Review of Books, Alexandra Marraccini praised the novel as a departure from other books of "[...] British import literary fantasy".

The book was included on The Guardian's and Tor.com's lists of the best science fiction and fantasy books of 2020.

References

2020 fantasy novels
British fantasy novels
Galley Beggar Press books